Jeff Dunham: Arguing with Myself is a stage performance of comedian and ventriloquist Jeff Dunham. The show was taped in Santa Ana, California. The DVD was released on April 11, 2006.

Characters
Walter - A grumpy old Vietnam war veteran with an attitude who frequently complains about his wife.
Sweet Daddy Dee - Jeff's new manager from the street who says he's a "Player In the Management Profession. PIMP." According to Sweet Daddy, that makes Jeff the "ho".
Bubba J - In Jeff's own words, "Pretty much just white-trash trailer-park." He talks about NASCAR and his love of beer.
Peanut - A purple woozle from Micronesia described by Walter as "a frickin' Muppet on crack." He wears one red Converse shoe on his left foot. In the first and second specials, he mocks José's accent, and his status on a stick, saying, "Maybe it was a horrible pogo accident. You know, doing-doing.... crriccck! Olé!" 
José Jalapeño on a Stick - a jalapeño pepper on a stick, or "steek" as he says it with a Hispanic accent.

DVD release
The special was released on DVD and on Blu-ray Disc later. This was the first special that had a choice of the censored or uncensored versions of the special. The only other two with that choice are Controlled Chaos and Minding the Monsters. The DVD's special feature include:

"Puppet bloopers" - Two bloopers, Peanut's hair flies off and Walter arms uncross.
"Violation of the Peanut Doll" - Walter introduces a video of a small dog humping a Peanut doll.
"Walter's Goodbye" - The camera approaches Walter and Walter states he doesn't do interviews and he'll "kick your ass to Calcutta".
"Audio Commentary" - Commentary on the special by Jeff and Kelly Asbury (author of the book, Dummy Days and co-directed Shrek 2).

Chart performance

Certifications and sales

References

External links

2006 direct-to-video films
2006 films
American comedy films
Stand-up comedy on DVD
2006 comedy films
2000s English-language films
2000s American films